Anikó Cirjenics-Kovacsics (born 29 August 1991) is a Hungarian handballer for Ferencvárosi TC and the Hungarian national team.

She started to play at the young age of 10.   She signed to Győri Audi ETO KC in 2006, where she quickly rose through the ranks and became a regular member of the first team at a very young age. She is reputed as a possible successor of world-class playmaker and former teammate Anita Görbicz.

Kovacsics made her international debut on 22 September 2009 against Germany. She represented Hungary on five World Championship (2009, 2013, 2015, 2017, 2019) and also participated on five European Championship (2010, 2012, 2014, 2018, 2020).

Anikó scored 15 goals against SG BBM Bietigheim in the 2018–19 Women's EHF Champions League season.

Achievements
Nemzeti Bajnokság I:
Winner: 2008, 2009, 2010, 2011, 2012, 2013, 2014, 2016, 2021
Magyar Kupa:
Winner: 2008, 2009, 2010, 2011, 2012, 2013, 2014, 2015, 2016, 2017
EHF Champions League:
Winner: 2013, 2014
Finalist: 2009, 2012, 2016
Semifinalist: 2010, 2011
Women's 19 European Championship:
Silver Medalist: 2009
European Championship:
Bronze Medalist: 2012

Individual awards
 Hungarian Handballer of the Year: 2018
 Hungarian Junior Handballer of the Year: 2009, 2010
 Junior Prima Award: 2010
 All-Star Team Best Centre Back of the EHF Champions League: 2015
 All-Star Team Best Left Wing of the EHF Champions League: 2016

Personal life
She has two younger brothers, Péter and Ferenc, both of them are professional handball players.

Her husband is Miklós Cirjenics, hungarian judoka. Their son, Marcell was born in July 2022.

References

External links

Profile on Győri Audi ETO KC Official Website
Career statistics at Worldhandball

1991 births
Living people
People from Nagyatád
Hungarian female handball players
Győri Audi ETO KC players
Hungarian people of Serbian descent
Ferencvárosi TC players (women's handball)
Handball players at the 2020 Summer Olympics
Sportspeople from Somogy County